The Divine Word Seminary Tagaytay (DWST) is a Roman Catholic mission seminary located in Tagaytay, Cavite, Philippines. Established in 1933, the seminary is owned and administered by the Society of the Divine Word (Latin: Societas Verbi Divini, or SVD). The primary purpose of the seminary is to prepare missionaries for both the Philippine and foreign missions. Its students are mostly seminarians preparing for the priesthood, and come from a cluster of around 14 autonomous affiliated houses of formation.

Academic programs
DWST offers the following degrees:

 a four-year Theology course; 
 Sacrae Theologiae Baccalaureus or S.T.B. – diploma comes from Pontifical Urbaniana University in Rome; 
 M. A. in Theology; 
 A.B. in Theology; and 
 Certificate in Theological Studies directed mainly to the laity.

DWST also hosts a house of formation for the SVD-Philippines—the SVD Scholasticat and the Divine Word Institute of Mission Studies (DWIMS).

Included in its academic programs are the following courses/subjects:
 Ecclesiastical Course (course for candidates for the priesthood)
 Licentiate in Mission Theology (run by the Divine Word Institute of Mission Studies)
 Baccalaureate in Sacred Theology (degree conferred by the Pontifical Urbaniana University, Rome)
 AB Theology Degree (recognized by CHED)
 M.A. in Theology, Major in Moral Theology
 M.A. in Theology, Major in Missiology
 M.A. in Theology, Major in Sacred Scriptures
 M.A. in Theology Major in Systematic Theology
 M. A. in Theology: Major in Pastoral Ministry (non-thesis)
 M. A. in Theology Major in Mission Studies (Non-thesis)
 Certificate in Theological Studies (CTS)
 SVD-Alternative Learning System (SVD-ALS)

Administration

Affiliated houses of formation 
 Divine Word Seminary Scholasticate (SVD) - Rector, Fr. Samuel Agcaracar, SVD
 Mission Society of the Philippines (MSP) - Fr. Roberto Ruben Elago, MSP
 Missionaries of St. Francis de Sales (MSFS)- Rector, Fr. Binoy, MSFS
 Oblates of Saint Joseph (OSJ) - Fr. Randy dela Rosa, OSJ
 Religious Tertiary Capuchins of Our Lady of Sorrows (Amigonians) - Fr. Renz Canuto, TC
 Saint Augustine Major Seminary (SASMA)- Rector, Fr. Andy Lubi
 Saint Lawrence of Brindisi House of Studies (OFM Capuchins) - Rector, Fr. Arnold M. Montealto, OFMCap
 Saint Paul Seminary Foundation (SSP)- Rector, Fr. Norman Pena, SSP
 Saint Paul Scholasticate (Barnabites) - Rector, Fr. Jesus Allado, CRSP
 San Pablo Theological Formation House - Rector, Fr. Jose Segudo
 Servants of the Paraclete (sP)- Rector, Fr. Peter Khan
 Somascan Major Seminary (Somascans)- Fr. Gabriele Scotti, CRS
 Tahanan ng Mabuting Pastol (TMP)- Rector, Fr. Michael Cron
 Two Hearts (OATH and SMITH)- Superior, Bishop Leopoldo Jaucian

Deans
The School of Theology had graduates already from the school years 1964–1969, but there was no official appointment of a dean for the school. The school's entity was closely associated with the rector, thus there was no official appointment for a dean until the start of the school-year 1969.
 Fr. Antonio Pernia, SVD, STD 2020–present
 Fr. Guilberto Marqueses, SVD, STL 2017-2020
 Fr. Randolf Flores, SVD, SSL, PhD and STD – 2014–2017
 Fr. Felix Ferrer, SVD, STD – 2013–2014
 Fr. Alexander Muaña, SVD, STL – 2008–2013
 Fr. Michael Layugan, SVD, PhD and STD – 2004–2008
 Fr. Felix Ferrer, SVD, STD- 1999–2004
 Fr. Lino Nicasio, SVD, PhD – 1996–1999
 Fr. Antolin Uy, SVD, PhD – 1995–1996
 Fr. Lino Nicasio, SVD, PhD – 1992–1995
 Fr. Guillermo Villegas, SVD, SSL, STD – 1990–1992
 Fr. Constante Floresca, SVD, MA – 1988
 Fr. Antolin Uy, SVD, PhD – 1987–1990
 Fr. Florencio Lagura, SVD, STD – 1985–1987
 Fr. Herbert Scholz, SVD, STD – 1981–1985
 Fr. Reiner Franke, SVD, SSL – 1975–1981
 Fr. Macario Magboo, SVD, STL – 1972–1975
 Fr. Frederick Scharpf, SVD, SSL – 1969–1972

References

 Antolin Uy, "Divine Word Seminary: History, Perspective and Orientation Towards New Evangelization," Diwa: Studies in Philosophy and Theology 39 (2014): 69–77.
 Deans of the Divine Word Seminary
 Rectors of the Divine Word Seminary
 Houses of the Divine Word Seminary
 School History
 Administration
Vision

External links
 Divine Word Seminary
 Societas Verbi Divini
 The Divine Word Seminary – video presentation created by the fourth year Scholastics 2006; music by Fr. Raul Caga, SVD

Catholic seminaries in the Philippines
Christian organizations established in 1933
Catholic organizations established in the 20th century
Divine Word Missionaries Order
1933 establishments in the Philippines
Buildings and structures in Tagaytay